Journal of Pineal Research is a peer-reviewed scientific journal covering research on the pineal gland and its hormonal products, chiefly melatonin, in all vertebrate species. Experimental studies on circadian rhythms and sleep are also published by the journal.  It is published by John Wiley & Sons and the editor-in-chief is Gianluca Tosini. According to the Journal Citation Reports, the journal has a 2020 impact factor of 13.007.

References

External links
 

Endocrinology journals
Wiley (publisher) academic journals
Publications established in 1984
English-language journals
Physiology journals
Neuroscience journals